Najeran Alternative Forum (in Spanish: Foro Alternativo Najerino) is a political party in Nájera, La Rioja, Spain, founded in 1998. The party contested the 1999 and 2003 municipal elections.

Results:
 1999: 576 votes (15%), 2 seats
 2003: 345 votes (7.9%), 1 seat

See also
 Municipal elections in Nájera

External links
 Party website

Political parties in La Rioja (Spain)